DeWitt or Dewitt is a concatenated primarily American form of the Dutch surname De Witt or De Wit, both meaning "the white (one)", "the blond (one)". It also became a popular given name following the New York Governorship of DeWitt Clinton, whose mother Mary DeWitt was a descendant of the Dutch patrician De Witt family. People with the name include:

Surname
Bill DeWitt (1902–1982), American baseball executive
Bill DeWitt III (born ca. 1968), American baseball executive
Blake DeWitt (born 1985), American baseball player
Bryce DeWitt (1923–2004), American physicist known for the Wheeler–DeWitt equation and the DeWitt notation, brother of Hugh Hamilton DeWitt
Cali DeWitt (born 1973), American artist
Cécile DeWitt-Morette (1922–2017), French mathematician and physicist
Charles DeWitt (1727–1787), delegate to the Continental Congress of United States
Charles B. DeWitt (born 1950), American Director of the  National Institute of Justice
Charles G. DeWitt (1789–1839), U.S. Representative from New York
Dale DeWitt (born 1950), Oklahoma politician
David DeWitt, American computer science professor
David M. De Witt (1837–1912), U.S. Representative from New York
Doug DeWitt (born 1961), American boxer
George DeWitt (1922–1979), American singer and comedian
Green DeWitt (1787– 1835), American empresario in Mexican Texas
Helen DeWitt (born 1957), American novelist
Hugh Hamilton DeWitt (1933-1995) American ichthyologist, marine biologist and oceanographer, brother of Bryce DeWitt
Jacob H. De Witt (1784–1857), U.S. Representative from New York
Jason DeWitt, American poker player
Jerry DeWitt (born 1969), American author and public speaker
John DeWitt (athlete) (1881–1930), American track and field athlete
John DeWitt (gridiron football) (born 1970), American arena football player
John H. DeWitt Jr. (1906–1999), American radio broadcasting pioneer
John L. DeWitt (1880–1962), American general
Joyce DeWitt (born 1949), American actor
Keegan DeWitt (born 1982), American film composer, singer-songwriter and actor 
L. G. DeWitt (died 1990), American NASCAR team owner
Lew DeWitt (1938–1990), American country musician and singer, member of The Statler Brothers 
Lincoln DeWitt (born 1967), American skeleton racer
Lydia Maria Adams DeWitt (1859–1928), American pathologist and anatomist
Matt DeWitt (born 1977), American baseball player
Nellie Jane DeWitt (1895–1978), United States Navy Nurse Corps officer 
Patrick deWitt (born 1975), Canadian novelist and screenwriter
Philip Elmer-DeWitt (born 1949), American writer and editor
Renee Dewitt (born 1986), American model
Richard W. DeWitt (1838–1909), American Civil War soldier
Robert L. DeWitt (died 2003), American Episcopal bishop
Rocky DeWitt, American politician from Iowa
Roscoe DeWitt (1894–1975), American architect
Rosemarie DeWitt (born 1974), American actress
S.A. "Sam" DeWitt (1891–1963), American poet and socialist politician
Theresa DeWitt (born 1963), (born 1963), American sport shooter
William DeWitt Jr. (born 1941), American businessman
William Henry DeWitt (1827–1896), Tennessee politician

Given name

DeWitt Clinton Baxter (1829–1881), American artist and engraver
DeWitt Clinton Blair (1833–1915), American philanthropist and industrialist
DeWitt Bodeen (1908–1988), American screenwriter
DeWitt Clinton (1769–1828), Governor of New York 1817–1822 and 1825–1828
DeWitt Coffman (1854–1932), United States Navy admiral
DeWitt "Tex" Coulter (1924–2007), American football player
Dewitt Ellerbe (born 1981), American football player
DeWitt H. Fessenden (1885– >1952), American architect, critic, sketch artist, and author
De Witt Clinton Flanagan (1870–1903), U.S. Representative from New York
Dewitt Clinton Giddings (1827–1903), U.S. Representative  from Texas
DeWitt Godfrey (born 1960, American sculptor
DeWitt Hale (born 1917), Texas politician
Dewitt Clinton Haskin (c.1824–1900), American civil engineer 
DeWitt Hale (1917-2018), American lawyer and politician
DeWitt Henry (born 1941), American author and editor
DeWitt Hyde (1909–1986), U.S. Representative from Maryland
DeWitt Clinton Jansen (1840–1894), American hotelier
DeWitt Jennings (1871–1937), American film and stage actor
DeWitt John (1915-1985), American journalist, editor, and author
DeWitt Jones, American football coach
Dewitt Jones (born 1943), American photojournalist
Dewitt Clinton Leach (1822–1909), Michigan politician and newspaperman
Dewitt Clinton Lewis (1822–1899), American Civil War soldier
DeWitt Clinton Littlejohn (1818–1892), Speaker of the New York Assembly 1855, 1857 and 1859–1861
DeWitt Menyard (1944–2009), American basketball player
Dewitt Miller (1857–1911), American orator and book collector
R. DeWitt Miller (1910–1958), American science fiction writer
Dewitt H. Parker (1885–1949), American philosopher
DeWitt Peck (1894–1973), United States Marine Corps Major general
DeWitt Stetten Jr. (1909–1990), American biochemist
De Witt Sumners (born 1941), American mathematician
T. De Witt Talmage (1832–1902), American religious leader
DeWitt Wallace (1889–1981), American co-founder of Reader's Digest
DeWitt Webb (1840–1917), American physician, politician, and amateur naturalist
DeWitt Weaver (1912–1998), American football player and coach
DeWitt Weaver (golfer) (born 1939), American golfer, son of above
DeWitt Williams (1919–2016), South Carolina politician
DeWitt Clinton Wilson (1827–1895), Wisconsin politician

Fictional characters
Abby DeWitt, character from the Under the Dome TV series
Addison DeWitt, character from the drama film All About Eve
Alexandra DeWitt, character from the Green Lantern DC Comics series
Anna DeWitt, birth name of the main character Elizabeth from the BioShock Infinite video game, biological daughter of Booker
Booker DeWitt, the player protagonist of the BioShock Infinite video game
Dewitt, an anthropomorphic frog from the animated TV series Will and Dewitt
Emmett DeWitt, character from the film 10 Cloverfield Lane
Kearson DeWitt, Marvel Comics supervillain
Morgan DeWitt, character from the soap opera The Bold and the Beautiful
Rose DeWitt Bukater, female protagonist of the film Titanic
Xander Dewitt, main character from the film Bixler High Private Eye

See also
DeWitt (disambiguation)
De Wit (surname)